This is a list of audio recordings featuring Blaze Ya Dead Homie. He has released 6 studio albums, 4 EP's, 1 re-release/compilation, and 1 full length tour exclusive album. He has been signed to Gotham Zone Entertainment (1995—2000), Psychopathic Records (1998—2013), Majik Ninja Entertainment (2014—present).

Studio albums

Extended plays
2000: Blaze Ya Dead Homie EP
2012: Blaze 'n' Bake EP
2016: The Casket Maker EP
2016: Dead Vulture EP

Group albums

w/Dark Lotus (1998—2017)

w/Psychopathic Rydas (1999—2017)

w/Drive-By (2001—2006; 2007—present)

w/Zodiac MPrint (2006—2009; 2012—present)

w/Triple Threat (2005—present)

Re-releases
1 Less G n Da Hood: Deluxe G Edition (2006)

Guest Appearances

Singles

Music videos

Group Music Videos

References

Hip hop discographies